Julian Hopkin CBE is a physician, researcher and medical teacher. In 2004, he became the founding Head of the new Medical School at Swansea University. He is now Professor of Experimental Medicine at Swansea University Medical School and Honorary Physician at the Abertawe-Bro-Morgannwg (ABM) University Hospital.
He was appointed a CBE in 2011 for his services to medicine.

Career
Born in Ystradgynlais, Wales, Hopkin attended Maesydderwen School before proceeding to the Welsh National School of Medicine in Cardiff, graduating MB in 1972. He proceeded with his postgraduate clinical training in Cardiff, Oxford and Edinburgh, including a career-influencing period with John Crofton, the initiator of successful combination chemotherapy for tuberculosis. Hopkin undertook scientific training (Master and Doctorate) at the University and Medical Research Council Human Genetics (MRC Human Genetics Unit) in Edinburgh.

In Edinburgh, with John Evans, he described the potent mutagenic actions of cigarette smoke on human cells - going on to quantify the mutagenic  and cytotoxic actions of cigarette smoke and their relationship to lung cancer and pulmonary emphysema risks respectively.

Hopkin spent periods in pulmonary medicine practice, in medical student teaching (Fellow and Supervisor of clinical students at Brasenose College, Oxford, 1992–99), and in research at Birmingham and Oxford. In those periods he developed a robust bronchoscopic lavage method to secure precise microbial diagnostics and improved survivals for pneumonia in immuno-suppressed subjects. With Anne Wakefield, he settled the fungal taxonomic status of the important opportunistic pathogen, pneumocystis, and devised a precise mitochondrial rRNA diagnostic for pneumocystis pneumonia, applicable to simple non-invasive simple clinical samples and adopted worldwide.

With the rise in asthma prevalence (1980-2000), Hopkin undertook highly collaborative work addressing the underlying causes. He showed that common up-regulating genetic variants of Th2 immune signalling related to allergic disorder and high IgE levels (sharing, with Dr Taro Shirakawa, the 2001 Daiwa-Adrian Prize in Medicine) but also to low burdens of parasitic work infestation - proposing an evolutionary mechanism in which prevalent  parasitic worm infection has provided long term evolutionary selection for up-regulating genetic variants of Th-2 immunity. He contributed epidemiologic data that relate diminished bacterial exposures in early childhood (less tuberculosis; more oral antibiotic receipts) to increased allergic disorder. His current work builds on the latter and focuses on how bacterial exposures shape human immunity relevant to asthma, and how unravelling these microbial mechanisms may provide disease preventing agents.

Distinctions
 Fellow, Academy of Medical Sciences (2005)
 Fellow, Learned Society of Wales (2011)
 Commander of the Order of the British Empire, (CBE) - for services to Medicine (2011)

References

Year of birth missing (living people)
Living people
Welsh scholars and academics
Commanders of the Order of the British Empire
Academics of Swansea University